Battle of Berezina may refer to one of the following events that happened by the Berezina River:

Battle of Berezina, during Napoleon's retreat from Russia
Battles during the Polish–Soviet War:
 Battle of Berezina (1919), a failed Bolshevik assault
 Battle of the Berezina (1920)